The Sin is 2005 Thai erotic film aka Jan Dara 2 directed by Ong-Art Singlumpong.

Cast
Helen Nima-Riam
Andy-Watchra Thungkaprasert-Dhep
Sorapong Chatree - Cheng

External links
 

Thai thriller films
2005 films
2000s erotic thriller films